Shreyasi Singh (born 29 August 1991) is an Indian shooter and politician. She  competes in the double trap event. She won a gold medal in the Shooting at the 2018 Commonwealth Games in Gold Coast, Australia - Women's double trap and a silver medal at the 2014 Commonwealth Games in Glasgow, Scotland. In 2020, she joined India's ruling Bharatiya Janata Party and is a Member of Bihar Legislative Assembly from Jamui constituency.

Early life and education 
Shreyasi's grandfather Kumar Serender Singh and father Digvijay Singh were both presidents of the National Rifle Association of India in their lifetimes. Shreyasi hails from Gidhaur in Jamui district of Bihar and is from Rajput Caste.  Her father was also former union minister. Her mother Putul Kumari is also an ex-MP from Banka, Bihar. Shreyasi was an Arts student at Hansraj College, Delhi and MBA student at Manav Rachna International University, Faridabad.

Sports career 
Singh was part of the Indian team at the 2013 Trap Shooting World Cup held in Acapulco, Mexico. She won the 15th position there.

Singh competed in the singles and pair trap events at the 2010 Commonwealth Games in Delhi. She came 6th in single trap event and 5th in pair trap event. She won the silver medal in the singles double trap event at the 2014 Commonwealth Games in Glasgow having scored 92 points in the final. In the same year, she won the bronze medal at the 2014 Asian Games in Incheon in the Double trap team event, along with Shagun Chowdhary and Varsha Varman. She won gold medal in 61st national National Shooting Championship while representing Bihar, in 2017.

Political career

At the young age of 30, she joined the Bharatiya Janata Party in 2020 and successfully contested the 2020 Bihar Legislative Assembly election from Jamui (Vidhan Sabha constituency), defeating the RJD’s Vijay Prakash with a margin of over 41000 votes.

References

External links 
 Shreyasi Singh profile at ISSF

Living people
1991 births
People from Jamui district
Indian female sport shooters
Asian Games medalists in shooting
Shooters at the 2010 Asian Games
Shooters at the 2014 Asian Games
Shooters at the 2010 Commonwealth Games
Commonwealth Games silver medallists for India
Sportswomen from Bihar
Asian Games bronze medalists for India
Commonwealth Games medallists in shooting
21st-century Indian women
21st-century Indian people
Medalists at the 2014 Asian Games
Shooters at the 2018 Asian Games
Bharatiya Janata Party politicians from Bihar
Bihar MLAs 2020–2025
Recipients of the Arjuna Award
Medallists at the 2010 Commonwealth Games